Palais des Congrès (English: Convention center)
Belgium
Palais des congrès de Liège
France
 Centre des congrès de Saint-Étienne
 Centre international des congrès de Metz
 Cité Internationale des Congrès de Nantes
 Palais des congrès de Beaune
 Palais des congrès de Bordeaux
 Palais des congrès de La Rochelle
 Palais des congrès de Lyon
 Palais des congrès de Montpellier, see Corum (Montpellier)
 Palais des congrès de Nancy
 Palais des congrès de Nice
 Palais des congrès de Paris
 Palais des congrès de Toulon
 Palais des congrès du Technopole du Futuroscope
 Palais des congrès et de la Culture du Mans
 Québec (Canada)
 Palais des congrès de Québec
 Palais des congrès de Montréal
 Palais des congrès de Gatineau
 Togo
 Palais des congrès, Lomé